Venzke Glacier is a broad glacier flowing northward between Bowyer Butte and Perry Range into Getz Ice Shelf on the coast of Marie Byrd Land. The glacier was discovered and photographed from aircraft of the U.S. Antarctic Service in December 1940. It was mapped in detail by United States Geological Survey (USGS) from surveys and U.S. Navy photographs, 1959–66. It was named on 1 January 1974 (USGS Antarctic ID: 15956)  by the Advisory Committee on Antarctic Names (US-ACAN) for Captain Norman C. Venzke, U.S. Coast Guard, commanding officer of USCGC Northwind (WAGB-282) in Antarctica, 1972 and 1973, and a participant in several other Deep Freeze operations as ship's company officer aboard icebreakers.

References

Glaciers of Marie Byrd Land